Leutnant Ludwig Luer was a German World War I flying ace credited with six aerial victories.

World War I service

Luer was forwarded from Armee-Flug-Park 4 (Army Flight Park 4) to Jagdstaffel 27, a fighter squadron, on 7 March 1917. At that time, he was ranked as an Offizierstellvertreter (Deputy Officer). By August 1917, he had been commissioned as a Leutnant. On 14 August, he shot down an observation balloon west of Ypres at 1637 hours; that same day, he received the Iron Cross First Class.

On 9 September 1917, Luer shot down 70 Squadron Sopwith Camel serial number B3916 over Frezenberg. At 1010 hours on 24 October, he downed a SPAD from Naval Ten northeast of Zonnebeke. His fourth victory came on 5 November 1917, when he destroyed another Sopwith Camel.

On 5 January 1918, Luer left Jasta 27 to become the first Staffelführer (Commanding Officer) of Jagdstaffel 62.  He would score his fifth victory with them on the evening of 22 April, when he scored another SPAD over Mezieres. He would tally one more victory on 16 May 1918, over a SPAD over Montdidier. On 22 May, he went to hospital until 1 July. On 8 July 1918, Ludwig Luer was relieved from combat duty.

Sources of information

References
 Franks, Norman; Bailey, Frank W.; Guest, Russell. Above the Lines: The Aces and Fighter Units of the German Air Service, Naval Air Service and Flanders Marine Corps, 1914–1918. Grub Street, 1993. , .

German World War I flying aces
Recipients of the Iron Cross (1914)